Matt O'Meara (born August 7, 1982 in Milton, Ontario) is a professional Canadian football guard who is currently a free agent. He most recently played for the Saskatchewan Roughriders of the Canadian Football League. He was signed by the Roughriders as the third overall selection in the 2005 CFL Draft. He played CIS Football at McMaster University.

O'Meara has also played for the Winnipeg Blue Bombers. He re-signed with Saskatchewan on July 6, 2009.

References

External links

1982 births
Canadian football offensive linemen
Living people
McMaster Marauders football players
People from Milton, Ontario
Players of Canadian football from Ontario
Saskatchewan Roughriders players
Winnipeg Blue Bombers players